The 120 mm Krupp howitzer M1905 was a howitzer used by Turkey, Japan and a few smaller armies including during World War I. After the Ottoman Empires entrance into World War I in 1914 on the side of the Central Powers, it realized that it needed to modernize its artillery. The Model 1905 was a "stock gun" from Krupp that could be supplied to customers from parts on hand, on short notice and with minor alterations to suit the customers' needs. The Model 1905 was a conventional artillery piece for its time, except for a lack of a Gun shield for the crew. The lack of a Gun shield was not a major liability, as most artillery quickly moved into concealed positions after the first few months of war.

References

Bibliography 
Hogg, Ian. (2000). Twentieth-Century Artillery. New York: Barnes & Nobles. .

120 mm artillery
World War I artillery
World War I howitzers
Artillery of the Ottoman Empire